Moçambola (or Campeonato Moçambicano de Futebol, Portuguese for Mozambican Football Championship) is the top division of Mozambican football. It is organized by the Liga Moçambicana de Futebol.

History
In 1976, shortly after the country's independence from Portugal, the competition's first season was contested. Only five clubs took part: Académica Maputo, AD Pemba, Desportivo de Maputo, Desportivo Tete, and Textáfrica.

Until 2005, the competition was named Liga 2M. In 2005, the league was renamed to Moçambola.

Competition format
The league consists of 12 clubs, with each team competing against each other team twice, round-robin style, for a total of 24 matches per season. The bottom two clubs in the league table are relegated to the second division. It currently takes place between the months of March/April and October.

Moçambola – clubs 2022

Associação Black Bulls
Costa do Sol (Maputo)
Associação Desportiva de Vilankulos
Incomati Xinavane
Ferroviário Beira
Ferroviario Lichinga
Ferroviário Maputo
Ferroviário Nacala
Ferroviário Nampula
Liga Desportiva de Maputo
Matchedje Mocuba
UD Songo (Songo)

List of champions

Colonial champions

1956: Ferroviário (Lourenço Marques)
1957: Grupo Desportivo de Lourenço Marques
1958: Ferroviário (Beira)
1959: Sporting Clube de Nampula
1960: Sporting Clube de Lourenço Marques
1961: Ferroviário (Lourenço Marques)
1962: Sporting Clube de Lourenço Marques
1963: Ferroviário (Lourenço Marques)
1964: Grupo Desportivo de Lourenço Marques
1965: not finished
1966: Ferroviário (Lourenço Marques)
1967: Ferroviário (Lourenço Marques)
1968: Ferroviário (Lourenço Marques)
1969: Textáfrica (Vila Pery)
1970: Ferroviário (Lourenço Marques)
1971: Textáfrica (Vila Pery)
1972: Ferroviário (Lourenço Marques)
1973: Textáfrica (Vila Pery)
1974: Ferroviário (Beira)

Since independence

1975: no national championship
1976: Textáfrica do Chimoio
1977: Desportivo de Maputo
1978: Desportivo de Maputo
1979: Costa do Sol
1980: Costa do Sol
1981: Têxtil Punguè
1982: Ferroviario de Maputo
1983: Desportivo de Maputo
1984: Maxaquene
1985: Maxaquene
1986: Maxaquene
1987: Matchedje Maputo
1988: Desportivo de Maputo
1989: Ferroviario de Maputo
1990: Matchedje Maputo
1991: Costa do Sol
1992: Costa do Sol
1993: Costa do Sol
1994: Costa do Sol
1995: Desportivo de Maputo
1996: Ferroviario de Maputo
1997: Ferroviario de Maputo
1998/99: Ferroviario de Maputo
1999/00: Costa do Sol
2000/01: Costa do Sol
2002: Ferroviario de Maputo
2003: Maxaquene
2004: Ferroviário de Nampula
2005: Ferroviario de Maputo
2006: Desportivo de Maputo
2007: Costa do Sol
2008: Ferroviario de Maputo
2009: Ferroviario de Maputo
2010: Liga Desportiva
2011: Liga Desportiva
2012: Maxaquene
2013: Liga Desportiva
2014: Liga Desportiva
2015: Ferroviario de Maputo
2016: Ferroviário Beira
2017: UD Songo
2018: UD Songo
2019: Costa do Sol
2020: Cancelled due to COVID-19 pandemic 
2021: Associação Black Bulls
2022: UD Songo

Titles by team

Topscorers

References
Much of the content of this article comes from the equivalent French-language Wikipedia article and from the equivalent Portuguese-language Wikipedia article (retrieved June 12, 2006).

External links
League at fifa.com
RSSSF

 
Football leagues in Mozambique
Mozambique
1976 establishments in Mozambique
Sports leagues established in 1976